The Troy Sabres were an American semi-professional ice hockey team in Troy, Ohio. They played in the Continental Hockey League from 1982 to 1986, and the All-American Hockey League in the 1986–1987 season. The club folded in 1987. The team was coached by Moose Lallo and Maurice Benoit.

Season-by-season record

External links
Sabres' CnHL statistics at HockeyDB
Sabres' AALHL statistics at HockeyDB

Ice hockey teams in Ohio
All-American Hockey League teams
1982 establishments in Ohio
1987 disestablishments in Ohio
Ice hockey clubs established in 1982
Ice hockey clubs disestablished in 1987